PA26 may refer to:
 Pennsylvania Route 26
 Pennsylvania's 26th congressional district
 SESN1, a protein